= Seikh =

Seikh may refer to:

- a historical variant of Sikh
- a variant spelling of Sheikh
